Tagalog is an Austronesian language spoken as a first language by the ethnic Tagalog people, who make up a quarter of the population of the Philippines, and as a second language by the majority. Its standardized form, officially named Filipino, is the national language of the Philippines, and is one of two official languages, alongside English.

Tagalog is closely related to other Philippine languages, such as the Bikol languages, the Bisayan languages, Ilocano, Kapampangan, and Pangasinan, and more distantly to other Austronesian languages, such as the Formosan languages of Taiwan, Indonesian, Malay, Hawaiian, Māori, Malagasy, and many more.

Classification
Tagalog is a Central Philippine language within the Austronesian language family. Being Malayo-Polynesian, it is related to other Austronesian languages, such as Malagasy, Javanese, Indonesian, Malay, Tetum (of Timor), and Yami (of Taiwan). It is closely related to the languages spoken in the Bicol Region and the Visayas islands, such as the Bikol group and the Visayan group, including Waray-Waray, Hiligaynon and Cebuano.

Tagalog differs from its Central Philippine counterparts with its treatment of the Proto-Philippine schwa vowel . For example, Proto-Philippine  (adhere, stick) is Tagalog dikít and Visayan & Bikol dukot.

History

The word Tagalog is derived from the endonym taga-ilog ("river dweller"), composed of tagá- ("native of" or "from") and ilog ("river"). Linguists such as David Zorc and Robert Blust speculate that the Tagalogs and other Central Philippine ethno-linguistic groups originated in Northeastern Mindanao or the Eastern Visayas.

Possible words of Old Tagalog origin are attested in the Laguna Copperplate Inscription from the tenth century, which is largely written in Old Malay. The first known complete book to be written in Tagalog is the Doctrina Christiana (Christian Doctrine), printed in 1593. The Doctrina was written in Spanish and two transcriptions of Tagalog; one in the ancient, then-current Baybayin script and the other in an early Spanish attempt at a Latin orthography for the language.

Throughout the 333 years of Spanish rule, various grammars and dictionaries were written by Spanish clergymen. In 1610, the Dominican priest Francisco Blancas de San Jose published the Arte y reglas de la lengua tagala (which was subsequently revised with two editions in 1752 and 1832) in Bataan. In 1613, the Franciscan priest Pedro de San Buenaventura published the first Tagalog dictionary, his Vocabulario de la lengua tagala in Pila, Laguna.

The first substantial dictionary of the Tagalog language was written by the Czech Jesuit missionary Pablo Clain in the beginning of the 18th century. Clain spoke Tagalog and used it actively in several of his books. He prepared the dictionary, which he later passed over to Francisco Jansens and José Hernandez. Further compilation of his substantial work was prepared by P. Juan de Noceda and P. Pedro de Sanlucar and published as Vocabulario de la lengua tagala in Manila in 1754 and then repeatedly reedited, with the last edition being in 2013 in Manila.

Among others, Arte de la lengua tagala y manual tagalog para la administración de los Santos Sacramentos (1850) in addition to early studies of the language.

The indigenous poet Francisco Balagtas (1788–1862) is known as the foremost Tagalog writer, his most notable work being the 19th-century epic Florante at Laura.

Official status

Tagalog was declared the official language by the first revolutionary constitution in the Philippines, the Constitution of Biak-na-Bato in 1897.

In 1935, the Philippine constitution designated English and Spanish as official languages, but mandated the development and adoption of a common national language based on one of the existing native languages. After study and deliberation, the National Language Institute, a committee composed of seven members who represented various regions in the Philippines, chose Tagalog as the basis for the evolution and adoption of the national language of the Philippines. President Manuel L. Quezon then, on December 30, 1937, proclaimed the selection of the Tagalog language to be used as the basis for the evolution and adoption of the national language of the Philippines. In 1939, President Quezon renamed the proposed Tagalog-based national language as Wikang Pambansâ (national language). Quezon himself was born and raised in Baler, Aurora, which is a native Tagalog-speaking area. Under the Japanese puppet government during World War II, Tagalog as a national language was strongly promoted; the 1943 Constitution specifying: The government shall take steps toward the development and propagation of Tagalog as the national language.".

In 1959, the language was further renamed as "Pilipino". Along with English, the national language has had official status under the 1973 constitution (as "Pilipino") and the present 1987 constitution (as Filipino).

Controversy
The adoption of Tagalog in 1937 as basis for a national language is not without its own controversies. Instead of specifying Tagalog, the national language was designated as Wikang Pambansâ ("National Language") in 1939. Twenty years later, in 1959, it was renamed by then Secretary of Education, José Romero, as Pilipino to give it a national rather than ethnic label and connotation. The changing of the name did not, however, result in acceptance among non-Tagalogs, especially Cebuanos who had not accepted the selection.

The national language issue was revived once more during the 1971 Constitutional Convention. The majority of the delegates were even in favor of scrapping the idea of a "national language" altogether. A compromise solution was worked out—a "universalist" approach to the national language, to be called Filipino rather than Pilipino. The 1973 constitution makes no mention of Tagalog. When a new constitution was drawn up in 1987, it named Filipino as the national language. The constitution specified that as the Filipino language evolves, it shall be further developed and enriched on the basis of existing Philippine and other languages. However, more than two decades after the institution of the "universalist" approach, there seems to be little if any difference between Tagalog and Filipino.

Many of the older generation in the Philippines feel that the replacement of English by Tagalog in the popular visual media has had dire economic effects regarding the competitiveness of the Philippines in trade and overseas remittances.

Use in education

Upon the issuance of Executive Order No. 134, Tagalog was declared as basis of the National Language. On April 12, 1940, Executive No. 263 was issued ordering the teaching of the national language in all public and private schools in the country.

Article XIV, Section 6 of the 1987 Constitution of the Philippines specifies, in part:

Under Section 7, however:

In 2009, the Department of Education promulgated an order institutionalizing a system of mother-tongue based multilingual education ("MLE"), wherein instruction is conducted primarily in a student's mother tongue (one of the various regional Philippine languages) until at least grade three, with additional languages such as Filipino and English being introduced as separate subjects no earlier than grade two. In secondary school, Filipino and English become the primary languages of instruction, with the learner's first language taking on an auxiliary role. After pilot tests in selected schools, the MLE program was implemented nationwide from School Year (SY) 2012–2013.

Tagalog is the first language of a quarter of the population of the Philippines (particularly in Central and Southern Luzon) and the second language for the majority.

Extent of use

In the Philippines

According to the Philippine Statistics Authority, as of 2014, there were 100 million people living in the Philippines, where the vast majority have some basic level of understanding of the language. The Tagalog homeland, Katagalugan, covers roughly much of the central to southern parts of the island of Luzon—particularly in Aurora, Bataan, Batangas, Bulacan, Cavite, Laguna, Metro Manila, Nueva Ecija, Quezon, and Rizal. Tagalog is also spoken natively by inhabitants living on the islands of Marinduque and Mindoro, as well as Palawan to a lesser extent. Significant minorities are found in the other Central Luzon provinces of Pampanga and Tarlac, Ambos Camarines in Bicol Region, and the Cordillera city of Baguio. Tagalog is also the predominant language of Cotabato City in Mindanao, making it the only place outside of Luzon with a native Tagalog-speaking majority.

At the 2000 Philippines Census, it is spoken by approximately 57.3 million Filipinos, 96% of the household population who were able to attend school; slightly over 22 million, or 28% of the total Philippine population, speak it as a native language.

The following regions and provinces of the Philippines are majority Tagalog-speaking (from north to south):
 Central Luzon Region
 Aurora
 Bataan
 Bulacan
 Nueva Ecija
Zambales
 Metro Manila (National Capital Region)
 Southern Luzon (Calabarzon and Mimaropa)
 Batangas
 Cavite
 Laguna
 Rizal
 Quezon
 Marinduque
 Occidental Mindoro
 Oriental Mindoro
 Romblon (This is one the few provinces in Southern Tagalog area wherein Tagalog is not the majority native language; instead, the majority native languages belong to Visayan group.)
 Palawan (Historically, Palawan was a non-Tagalog-speaking province; due to waves of cross-migration from various regions, Tagalog is now one of the main spoken languages in Palawan alongside Palawanic and Visayan groups.)
 Bicol Region (While the Bikol languages have traditionally been the majority languages in the following provinces, heavy Tagalog influence and migration has resulted in its significant presence in these provinces and in many communities, Tagalog is now the majority language.)
 Camarines Norte
 Camarines Sur
 Bangsamoro
 Maguindanao (While Maguindanao has traditionally been the majority language of the province, Tagalog is now the main language of "mother tongue" primary education in the province and is the majority language in the regional center of Cotabato City, and is the lingua franca of Bangsamoro.)
Davao Region
Metro Davao (While Cebuano is the majority language of the region, a linguistic phenomenon has developed whereby local residents have either shifted to Tagalog or significantly mix Tagalog terms and grammar into their Cebuano speech, because the older generations speak Tagalog to their children in home settings, and Cebuano is spoken in everyday settings, making Tagalog the secondary lingua franca.)

Tagalog speakers are also found in other parts of the Philippines and through its standardized form of Filipino, the language serves the national lingua franca of the country.

Outside of the Philippines

Tagalog serves as the common language among Overseas Filipinos, though its use overseas is usually limited to communication between Filipino ethnic groups. The largest concentration of Tagalog speakers outside the Philippines is found in the United States, wherein 2013, the United States Census Bureau reported (based on data collected in 2011) that it was the fourth most-spoken non-English language at home with almost 1.6 million speakers, behind Spanish, French (including Patois, Cajun, Creole), and Chinese (with figures for Cantonese and Mandarin combined). In urban areas, Tagalog ranked as the third most spoken non-English language, behind Spanish and Chinese varieties but ahead of French.

A study based on data from the United States Census Bureau’s 2015 American Consumer Survey shows that Tagalog is the most commonly spoken non-English language after Spanish in California, Nevada, and Washington states.

Tagalog is one of three recognized languages in San Francisco, California, along with Spanish and Chinese, making all essential city services be communicated using these languages along with English. Meanwhile, Tagalog and Ilocano (which is primarily spoken in northern Philippines) are among the non-official languages of Hawaii that its state offices and state-funded entities are required to provide oral and written translations to its residents. Election ballots in Nevada include instructions written in Tagalog, which was first introduced in the 2020 United States presidential elections.

Other countries with significant concentrations of overseas Filipinos and Tagalog speakers include Saudi Arabia with 938,490, Canada with 676,775, Japan with 313,588, United Arab Emirates with 541,593, Kuwait with 187,067, and Malaysia with 620,043.

Dialects

At present, no comprehensive dialectology has been done in the Tagalog-speaking regions, though there have been descriptions in the form of dictionaries and grammars of various Tagalog dialects. Ethnologue lists Manila, Lubang, Marinduque, Bataan (Western Central Luzon), Batangas, Bulacan (Eastern Central Luzon), Tanay-Paete (Rizal-Laguna), and Tayabas (Quezon and Aurora) as dialects of Tagalog; however, there appear to be four main dialects, of which the aforementioned are a part: Northern (exemplified by the Bulacan dialect), Central (including Manila), Southern (exemplified by Batangas), and Marinduque.

Some example of dialectal differences are:
 Many Tagalog dialects, particularly those in the south, preserve the glottal stop found after consonants and before vowels. This has been lost in Standard Tagalog. For example, standard Tagalog ngayón (now, today), sinigáng (broth stew), gabí (night), matamís (sweet), are pronounced and written ngay-on, sinig-ang, gab-i, and matam-is in other dialects.
For example, bundók (mountain), dagat (sea), dingdíng (wall), isdâ (fish), and litid (joints) become bunrók, ragat, ringríng, isrâ, and litir, e.g. "sandók sa dingdíng" ("ladle on a wall" or "ladle on the wall", depending on the sentence) becoming "sanrók sa ringríng".
 In many southern dialects, the progressive aspect infix of -um- verbs is na-. For example, standard Tagalog kumakain (eating) is nákáin in Aurora, Quezon, and Batangas Tagalog. This is the butt of some jokes by other Tagalog speakers, for should a Southern Tagalog ask nákáin ka ba ng patíng? ("Do you eat shark?"), he would be understood as saying "Has a shark eaten you?" by speakers of the Manila Dialect.
 Some dialects have interjections which are considered a regional trademark. For example, the interjection ala e! usually identifies someone from Batangas as does hane?! in Rizal and Quezon provinces.

Perhaps the most divergent Tagalog dialects are those spoken in Marinduque. Linguist Rosa Soberano identifies two dialects, western and eastern, with the former being closer to the Tagalog dialects spoken in the provinces of Batangas and Quezon.

One example is the verb conjugation paradigms. While some of the affixes are different, Marinduque also preserves the imperative affixes, also found in Visayan and Bikol languages, that have mostly disappeared from most Tagalog early 20th century; they have since merged with the infinitive.

Northern and central dialects form the basis for the national language.

Phonology

Tagalog has 21 phonemes: 16 of them are consonants and 5 are vowels. Native Tagalog words follow CV(C) syllable structure, though complex consonant clusters are permitted in loanwords.

Vowels
Tagalog has five vowels, and four diphthongs. Tagalog is now considered to have five vowel phonemes following the introduction of two marginal phonemes from Spanish, /o/ and /e/.

  an open central unrounded vowel roughly similar to English "father"; in the middle of a word, a near-open central vowel similar to Received Pronunciation "cup"; or an open front unrounded vowel similar to Received Pronunciation or California English "hat"
  an open-mid front unrounded vowel similar to General American English "bed"
  a close front unrounded vowel similar to English "machine"
  a mid back rounded vowel similar to General American English "soul" or Philippine English "forty"
  a close back rounded vowel similar to English "flute"

Long vowels are not written apart from pedagogical texts, where an acute accent is used: á é í ó ú.

The table above shows all the possible realizations for each of the five vowel sounds depending on the speaker's origin or proficiency. The five general vowels are in bold.

Consonants
Below is a chart of Tagalog consonants. All the stops are unaspirated. The velar nasal occurs in all positions including at the beginning of a word. Loanword variants using these phonemes are italicized inside the angle brackets.

 between vowels has a tendency to become  as in loch, German Bach, whereas in the initial position it has a tendency to become , especially in the Manila dialect.
Intervocalic  and  tend to become , as in Spanish agua, especially in the Manila dialect.
A glottal stop that occurs in pausa (before a pause) is omitted when it is in the middle of a phrase, especially in the Metro Manila area. The vowel it follows is then lengthened. However, it is preserved in many other dialects.
The  phoneme is an alveolar rhotic that has a free variation between a trill, a flap and an approximant.
The  phoneme may become a consonant cluster  in between vowels such as sadyâ .

Glottal stop is not indicated. Glottal stops are most likely to occur when:
the word starts with a vowel, like aso (dog)
the word includes a dash followed by a vowel, like mag-aral (study)
the word has two vowels next to each other, like paano (how)
the word starts with a prefix followed by a verb that starts with a vowel, like mag-aayos ([will] fix)

Stress and final glottal stop
Stress is a distinctive feature in Tagalog. Primary stress occurs on either the final or the penultimate syllable of a word. Vowel lengthening accompanies primary or secondary stress except when stress occurs at the end of a word.

Tagalog words are often distinguished from one another by the position of the stress and/or the presence of a final glottal stop. In formal or academic settings, stress placement and the glottal stop are indicated by a diacritic (tuldík) above the final vowel. The penultimate primary stress position (malumay) is the default stress type and so is left unwritten except in dictionaries.

Grammar

Writing system

Tagalog, like other Philippines languages today, is written using the Latin alphabet. Prior to the arrival of the Spanish in 1521 and the beginning of their colonization in 1565, Tagalog was written in an abugida—or alphasyllabary—called Baybayin. This system of writing gradually gave way to the use and propagation of the Latin alphabet as introduced by the Spanish. As the Spanish began to record and create grammars and dictionaries for the various languages of the Philippine archipelago, they adopted systems of writing closely following the orthographic customs of the Spanish language and were refined over the years. Until the first half of the 20th century, most Philippine languages were widely written in a variety of ways based on Spanish orthography.

In the late 19th century, a number of educated Filipinos began proposing for revising the spelling system used for Tagalog at the time. In 1884, Filipino doctor and student of languages Trinidad Pardo de Tavera published his study on the ancient Tagalog script Contribucion para el Estudio de los Antiguos Alfabetos Filipinos and in 1887, published his essay El Sanscrito en la lengua Tagalog which made use of a new writing system developed by him. Meanwhile, Jose Rizal, inspired by Pardo de Tavera's 1884 work, also began developing a new system of orthography (unaware at first of Pardo de Tavera's own orthography). A major noticeable change in these proposed orthographies was the use of the letter ⟨k⟩ rather than ⟨c⟩ and ⟨q⟩ to represent the phoneme .

In 1889, the new bilingual Spanish-Tagalog La España Oriental newspaper, of which Isabelo de los Reyes was an editor, began publishing using the new orthography stating in a footnote that it would "use the orthography recently introduced by ... learned Orientalis". This new orthography, while having its supporters, was also not initially accepted by several writers. Soon after the first issue of La España, Pascual H. Poblete's Revista Católica de Filipina began a series of articles attacking the new orthography and its proponents. A fellow writer, Pablo Tecson was also critical. Among the attacks was the use of the letters "k" and "w" as they were deemed to be of German origin and thus its proponents were deemed as "unpatriotic". The publishers of these two papers would eventually merge as La Lectura Popular in January 1890 and would eventually make use of both spelling systems in its articles. Pedro Laktaw, a schoolteacher, published the first Spanish-Tagalog dictionary using the new orthography in 1890.

In April 1890, Jose Rizal authored an article Sobre la Nueva Ortografia de la Lengua Tagalog in the Madrid-based periodical La Solidaridad. In it, he addressed the criticisms of the new writing system by writers like Pobrete and Tecson and the simplicity, in his opinion, of the new orthography. Rizal described the orthography promoted by Pardo de Tavera as "more perfect" than what he himself had developed. The new orthography was however not broadly adopted initially and was used inconsistently in the bilingual periodicals of Manila until the early 20th century. The revolutionary society Kataás-taasan, Kagalang-galang Katipunan ng̃ mg̃á Anak ng̃ Bayan or Katipunan made use of the k-orthography and the letter k featured prominently on many of its flags and insignias.

In 1937, Tagalog was selected to serve as basis for the country's national language. In 1940, the Balarílà ng Wikang Pambansâ of grammarian Lope K. Santos introduced the Abakada alphabet. This alphabet consists of 20 letters and became the standard alphabet of the national language. The orthography as used by Tagalog would eventually influence and spread to the systems of writing used by other Philippine languages (which had been using variants of the Spanish-based system of writing). In 1987, the ABAKADA was dropped and in its place is the expanded Filipino alphabet.

Baybayin

Tagalog was written in an abugida (alphasyllabary) called Baybayin prior to the Spanish colonial period in the Philippines, in the 16th century. This particular writing system was composed of symbols representing three vowels and 14 consonants. Belonging to the Brahmic family of scripts, it shares similarities with the Old Kawi script of Java and is believed to be descended from the script used by the Bugis in Sulawesi.

Although it enjoyed a relatively high level of literacy, Baybayin gradually fell into disuse in favor of the Latin alphabet taught by the Spaniards during their rule.

There has been confusion of how to use Baybayin, which is actually an abugida, or an alphasyllabary, rather than an alphabet. Not every letter in the Latin alphabet is represented with one of those in the Baybayin alphasyllabary. Rather than letters being put together to make sounds as in Western languages, Baybayin uses symbols to represent syllables.

A "kudlit" resembling an apostrophe is used above or below a symbol to change the vowel sound after its consonant. If the kudlit is used above, the vowel is an "E" or "I" sound. If the kudlit is used below, the vowel is an "O" or "U" sound. A special kudlit was later added by Spanish missionaries in which a cross placed below the symbol to get rid of the vowel sound all together, leaving a consonant. Previously, the consonant without a following vowel was simply left out (for example, bundok being rendered as budo), forcing the reader to use context when reading such words.

Example:

Latin alphabet

Abecedario
Until the first half of the 20th century, Tagalog was widely written in a variety of ways based on Spanish orthography consisting of 32 letters called 'ABECEDARIO' (Spanish for "alphabet"). The additional letters from the 26-letter English alphabet are: ch, ll, ng, ñ, n͠g / ñg, and rr.

Abakada

When the national language was based on Tagalog, grammarian Lope K. Santos introduced a new alphabet consisting of 20 letters called ABAKADA in school grammar books called balarilà. The only letter not in the English alphabet is ng.

Revised alphabet

In 1987, the Department of Education, Culture and Sports issued a memo stating that the Philippine alphabet had changed from the Pilipino-Tagalog Abakada version to a new 28-letter alphabet to make room for loans, especially family names from Spanish and English. The additional letters from the 26-letter English alphabet are: ñ, ng.

ng and mga

The genitive marker ng and the plural marker mga (e.g. Iyan ang mga damit ko. (Those are my clothes)) are abbreviations that are pronounced nang  and mangá . Ng, in most cases, roughly translates to "of" (ex. Siya ay kapatid ng nanay ko. She is the sibling of my mother) while nang usually means "when" or can describe how something is done or to what extent (equivalent to the suffix -ly in English adverbs), among other uses. 
 Nang si Hudas ay nadulás.—When Judas slipped.
 Gumising siya nang maaga.—He woke up early.
 Gumalíng nang  si Juan dahil nag-ensayo siya.—Juan greatly improved because he practiced.

In the first example, nang is used in lieu of the word noong (when; Noong si Hudas ay madulas). In the second, nang describes that the person woke up (gumising) early (maaga); gumising nang maaga. In the third, nang described up to what extent that Juan improved (gumaling), which is "greatly" (nang ). In the latter two examples, the ligature na and its variants -ng and -g may also be used (Gumising na maaga/Maagang gumising; Gumaling na /Todong gumaling).

The longer nang may also have other uses, such as a ligature that joins a repeated word:
Naghintáy sila nang naghintáy.—They kept on waiting" (a closer calque: "They were waiting and waiting.")

pô/hô and opò/ohò
The words pô/hô originated from the word "Panginoon." and "Poon." ("Lord."). When combined with the basic affirmative Oo "yes" (from Proto-Malayo-Polynesian *heqe), the resulting forms are opò and ohò.

"Pô" and "opò" are specifically used to denote a high level of respect when addressing older persons of close affinity like parents, relatives, teachers and family friends. "Hô" and "ohò" are generally used to politely address older neighbours, strangers, public officials, bosses and nannies, and may suggest a distance in societal relationship and respect determined by the addressee's social rank and not their age. However, "pô" and "opò" can be used in any case in order to express an elevation of respect.
Example: "Pakitapon naman pô/hô yung basura." ("Please throw away the trash.")

Used in the affirmative:
Ex: "Gutóm ka na ba?" "Opò/Ohò". ("Are you hungry yet?" "Yes.")

Pô/Hô may also be used in negation.
Ex: "Hindi ko pô/hô alam 'yan." ("I don't know that.")

Vocabulary and borrowed words

Tagalog vocabulary is mostly of native Austronesian or Tagalog origin, such as most of the words that end with the diphthong -iw, (e.g. giliw) and words that exhibit reduplication (e.g. halo-halo, patpat, etc.). Besides inherited cognates, this also accounts for innovations in Tagalog vocabulary, especially traditional ones within its dialects. Tagalog has also incorporated many Spanish and English loanwords; the necessity of which increases in more technical parlance.

In precolonial times, Trade Malay was widely known and spoken throughout Maritime Southeast Asia, contributing a significant number of Malay vocabulary into the Tagalog language. Malay loanwords, identifiable or not, may often already be considered native as these have existed in the language before colonisation.

Tagalog also includes loanwords from Indian languages (Sanskrit and Tamil, mostly through Malay), Chinese languages (mostly Hokkien, followed by Cantonese, Mandarin, etc.), Japanese, Arabic and Persian.

English has borrowed some words from Tagalog, such as abaca, barong, balisong, boondocks, jeepney, Manila hemp, pancit, ylang-ylang, and yaya. Some of these loanwords are more often used in Philippine English.

Tagalog has contributed several words to Philippine Spanish, like barangay (from balan͠gay, meaning barrio), the abacá, cogon, palay, dalaga etc.

Tagalog words of foreign origin

Taglish (Englog)

Taglish and Englog are names given to a mix of English and Tagalog. The amount of English vs. Tagalog varies from the occasional use of English loan words to changing language in mid-sentence. Such code-switching is prevalent throughout the Philippines and in various languages of the Philippines other than Tagalog.

Code-mixing also entails the use of foreign words that are "Filipinized" by reforming them using Filipino rules, such as verb conjugations. Users typically use Filipino or English words, whichever comes to mind first or whichever is easier to use.

City-dwellers are more likely to do this.

The practice is common in television, radio, and print media as well. Advertisements from companies like Wells Fargo, Wal-Mart, Albertsons, McDonald's and Western Union have contained Taglish.

Cognates with other Philippine languages

Austronesian comparison chart
Below is a chart of Tagalog and a number of other Austronesian languages comparing thirteen words.

Religious literature

Religious literature remains one of the most dynamic components to Tagalog literature. The first Bible in Tagalog, then called Ang Biblia ("the Bible") and now called Ang Dating Biblia ("the Old Bible"), was published in 1905. In 1970, the Philippine Bible Society translated the Bible into modern Tagalog. Even before the Second Vatican Council, devotional materials in Tagalog had been in circulation. There are at least four circulating Tagalog translations of the Bible
 the Magandang Balita Biblia (a parallel translation of the Good News Bible), which is the ecumenical version
 the Bibliya ng Sambayanang Pilipino
 the 1905 Ang Biblia, used more by Protestants
 the Bagong Sanlibutang Salin ng Banal na Kasulatan (New World Translation of the Holy Scriptures), exclusive to the Jehovah’s Witnesses

When the Second Vatican Council, (specifically the Sacrosanctum Concilium) permitted the universal prayers to be translated into vernacular languages, the Catholic Bishops' Conference of the Philippines was one of the first to translate the Roman Missal into Tagalog. The Roman Missal in Tagalog was published as early as 1982.

Jehovah's Witnesses were printing Tagalog literature at least as early as 1941 and The Watchtower (the primary magazine of Jehovah's Witnesses) has been published in Tagalog since at least the 1950s. New releases are now regularly released simultaneously in a number of languages, including Tagalog. The official website of Jehovah's Witnesses also has some publications available online in Tagalog. The revised bible edition, the New World Translation of the Holy Scriptures, was released in Tagalog on 2019 and it is distributed without charge both printed and online versions.

Tagalog is quite a stable language, and very few revisions have been made to Catholic Bible translations. Also, as Protestantism in the Philippines is relatively young, liturgical prayers tend to be more ecumenical.

Examples

Lord's Prayer
In Tagalog, the Lord's Prayer is known by its incipit, Amá Namin (literally, "Our Father").

Universal Declaration of Human Rights
This is Article 1 of the Universal Declaration of Human Rights (Pángkalahatáng Pagpapahayag ng Karapatáng Pantao)

Numbers
Numbers (mga bilang/mga numero) in Tagalog follow two systems. The first consists of native Tagalog words and the other are Spanish-derived. (This may be compared to other East Asian languages, except with the second set of numbers borrowed from Spanish instead of Chinese.) For example, when a person refers to the number "seven", it can be translated into Tagalog as "pito" or "siyete" (Spanish: siete).

Months and days
Months and days in Tagalog are also localised forms of Spanish months and days. "Month" in Tagalog is buwán (also the word for moon) and "day" is araw (the word also means sun). Unlike Spanish, however, months and days in Tagalog are always capitalised.

Time
Time expressions in Tagalog are also Tagalized forms of the corresponding Spanish. "Time" in Tagalog is panahón or oras.

Common phrases

*Pronouns such as niyo (2nd person plural) and nila (3rd person plural) are used on a single 2nd person in polite or formal language. See Tagalog grammar.

Proverbs
Ang hindî marunong lumingón sa pinánggalingan ay hindî makaráratíng sa paroroonan. 
(— José Rizal)
One who knows not how to look back to whence he came will never get to where he is going.

Unang kagat, tinapay pa rin.First bite, still bread.All fluff, no substance.

Tao ka nang humarap, bilang tao kitang haharapin.You reach me as a human, I will treat you as a human and never act as a traitor.(A proverb in Southern Tagalog that has made people aware of the significance of sincerity in Tagalog communities.)

Hulí man daw (raw) at magalíng, nakáhahábol pa rin.If one is behind but capable, one will still be able to catch up.

Magbirô ka na sa lasíng, huwág lang sa bagong gising.Make fun of someone drunk, if you must, but never one who has just awakened.

Aanhín pa ang damó kung patáy na ang kabayo?What use is the grass if the horse is already dead?

Ang sakít ng kalingkingan, damdám ng buóng katawán.The pain in the pinkie is felt by the whole body.
In a group, if one goes down, the rest follow.

Nasa hulí ang pagsisisi.Regret is always in the end.

Pagkáhabà-habà man ng prusisyón, sa simbahan pa rin ang tulóy.The procession may stretch on and on, but it still ends up at the church.
(In romance: refers to how certain people are destined to be married. In general: refers to how some things are inevitable, no matter how long you try to postpone it.)

Kung 'dî mádaán sa santóng dasalan, daanin sa santóng paspasan.If it cannot be got through holy prayer, get it through blessed force.
(In romance and courting: santóng paspasan literally means 'holy speeding' and is a euphemism for sexual intercourse. It refers to the two styles of courting by Filipino boys: one is the traditional, protracted, restrained manner favored by older generations, which often featured serenades and manual labor for the girl's family; the other is upfront seduction, which may lead to a slap on the face or a pregnancy out of wedlock. The second conclusion is known as pikot or what Western cultures would call a 'shotgun marriage'. This proverb is also applied in terms of diplomacy and negotiation.)

See also
Dambana
Abakada alphabet
Komisyon sa Wikang Filipino
Filipino alphabet
Old Tagalog
Filipino orthography
Tagalog Wikipedia
Filipino language

References

Further reading

External links

 Tagalog Dictionary
 Tagalog verbs with conjugation
 Tagalog Lessons Dictionary
 Tagalog Quotes
 Patama Quotes
 Tagalog Translate
 Tagalog Forum
 Kaipuleohone archive of Tagalog

 
Languages attested from the 10th century
Languages of the Philippines
Central Philippine languages
Agglutinative languages
Subject–verb–object languages
Verb–object–subject languages
Verb–subject–object languages